Belah is a suburb of Carlisle in the City of Carlisle district, in the county of Cumbria, England.

References

Areas of Carlisle, Cumbria